Robert Alan Aurthur (June 10, 1922 – November 20, 1978) was an American screenwriter, film director, and film producer. Many of his works examined race relations and featured In the Heat of the Night star Sidney Poitier.

Early life
Raised in Freeport, New York (on Long Island), he was a pre‐med student at the University of Pennsylvania. Once World War II broke out, he left to join the Marines during which he served as a combat correspondent.

Television

In the early years of television, he wrote for Studio One and then moved on to write episodes of Mister Peepers (1952–53). He followed with teleplays for Campbell Playhouse (1954), Justice (1954), Goodyear Television Playhouse (1953–54) and Producers' Showcase (1955). One of his four 1951–55 plays for Philco Television Playhouse was the Emmy-nominated A Man Is Ten Feet Tall (1955), with Don Murray and Sidney Poitier, which was adapted two years later as the theatrical film, Edge of the City (1957) with Poitier and John Cassavetes.

He wrote two teleplays for Playhouse 90. One of them, A Sound of Different Drummers (October 3, 1957), borrowed so heavily from Ray Bradbury's Fahrenheit 451 that Bradbury sued. 

Aurthur appeared with Merle Miller in David Susskind's 2012 documentary about President Truman titled Give 'em Hell, Harry, stating, "Going into a Howard Johnson's was bad enough, but with a President!" They discussed George Marshall, Dwight Eisenhower, and Richard Nixon, as well as their observations on Truman's respect for Marshall.

Film
After 1957, he continued to write screenplays. He was one of the writers on Spring Reunion (1957), notable as Betty Hutton's final film, following with Warlock (1959), and his earlier association with Cassavetes led to script contributions on the actor's directorial debut with Shadows (1959). After an uncredited contribution to Lilith (1964), he scripted John Frankenheimer's Grand Prix (1966).

He wrote and directed The Lost Man (1969) about a black militant (Sidney Poitier). As the writer-producer of All That Jazz (1979), he received two posthumous Academy Award nominations.

Theatre
Three plays written by Aurthur were produced on Broadway: A Very Special Baby (1956), Kwamina (1961), and Carry Me Back to Morningside Heights (1968). Kwamina was a collaboration with composer and lyricist Richard Adler, starring Adler's wife, Sally Ann Howes. The subject material, an interracial love affair, proved too controversial and the show closed. Carry Me Back to Morningside Heights was directed by Sidney Poitier and starred African-American stars Louis Gossett Jr. and Cicely Tyson; the plot involved a young Jewish man who insisted on becoming a slave to an African-American law student as a penance for the years of wrongs whites have done to blacks. It closed after seven performances.

Personal life
Aurthur served in the United States Marine Corps during World War II. He was the first husband of actress Beatrice Arthur, who also served in the Marines; they divorced in 1950 and had no children. She used a variation of his surname as her professional name. 

His second wife was Virginia Aurthur. One of their children was Jonathan Aurthur (1948–2004), who died by suicide eight years after his own son (Robert & Virginia's grandson) had committed suicide, and about which Jonathan Aurthur had written a book. At the time of his death Robert Alan Authur was married to Jane Wetherell Aurthur, a former television producer; they had one daughter, Kate Aurthur, who as of 2020 was an editor at Variety.

Death
Aurthur died of lung cancer in New York City, aged 56, in 1978. In 2009, his former wife, Bea Arthur, would die of the same disease, aged 86.

References

External links

Robert Alan Aurthur – BFI database entry
Robert Alan Aurthur – allmovie

1922 births
1978 deaths
American male screenwriters
Television producers from New York City
Deaths from lung cancer in New York (state)
People from Freeport, New York
Writers from New York City
Military personnel from New York City
20th-century American businesspeople
Film directors from New York City
Screenwriters from New York (state)
Princeton University alumni
20th-century American male writers
20th-century American screenwriters
United States Marine Corps personnel of World War II
American war correspondents of World War II